Sipsey is the name of several features in the U.S. state of Alabama:

 Sipsey, Alabama, a town in Walker County
 The Sipsey Wilderness, a wilderness area in the Bankhead National Forest
Sipsey Fork of the Black Warrior River, flowing through the Sipsey Wilderness
 The Sipsey River and swamp near Tuscaloosa, unrelated to the Sipsey Fork of the Black Warrior Rive

See also
Sipsey Creek (disambiguation)
Sipsey Fork (disambiguation)